Francis II or I (12 February 1768 – 2 March 1835) was the last Holy Roman Emperor as Francis II (from 1792 to 1806), and the founder and Emperor of the Austrian Empire as Francis I (from 1804 to 1835). He assumed the title of Emperor of Austria in response to the coronation of Napoleon as Emperor of the French. Soon after Napoleon created the Confederation of the Rhine, Francis abdicated as Holy Roman Emperor. He was King of Hungary, Croatia and Bohemia. He also served as the first president of the German Confederation following its establishment in 1815.

Francis II continued his leading role as an opponent of Napoleonic France in the Napoleonic Wars, and suffered several more defeats after the Battle of Austerlitz. The marriage of his daughter Marie Louise of Austria to Napoleon on 10 March 1810 was arguably his severest personal defeat. After the abdication of Napoleon following the War of the Sixth Coalition, Austria participated as a leading member of the Holy Alliance at the Congress of Vienna, which was largely dominated by Francis' chancellor Klemens von Metternich culminating in a new European map and the restoration of most of Francis' ancient dominions. Due to the establishment of the Concert of Europe, which largely resisted popular nationalist and liberal tendencies, Francis was viewed as a reactionary later in his reign.

Francis II's grandchildren included Napoleon II (Napoleon's only legitimate son), Franz Joseph I of Austria, Maximilian I of Mexico, Maria II of Portugal and Pedro II of Brazil.

Early life 

Francis was a son of Emperor Leopold II (1747–1792) and his wife Maria Luisa of Spain (1745–1792), daughter of Charles III of Spain. Francis was born in Florence, the capital of Tuscany, where his father reigned as Grand Duke from 1765 to 1790. Though he had a happy childhood surrounded by his many siblings, his family knew Francis was likely to be a future Emperor (his uncle Joseph had no surviving issue from either of his two marriages), and so in 1784 the young Archduke was sent to the Imperial Court in Vienna to educate and prepare him for his future role.

Emperor Joseph II himself took charge of Francis' development. His disciplinarian regime was a stark contrast to the indulgent Florentine Court of Leopold.  The Emperor wrote that Francis was "stunted in growth", "backward in bodily dexterity and deportment", and "neither more nor less than a spoiled mother's child."  Joseph concluded that "the manner in which he was treated for upwards of sixteen years could not but have confirmed him in the delusion that the preservation of his own person was the only thing of importance."

Joseph's martinet method of improving the young Francis was "fear and unpleasantness." The young Archduke was isolated, the reasoning being that this would make him more self-sufficient as it was felt by Joseph that Francis "failed to lead himself, to do his own thinking." Nonetheless, Francis greatly admired his uncle, if rather feared him. To complete his training, Francis was sent to join an army regiment in Hungary and he settled easily into the routine of military life. He was present at the siege of Belgrade which occurred during the Austro-Turkish War. 

After the death of Joseph II in 1790, Francis' father became Emperor. He had an early taste of power while acting as Leopold's deputy in Vienna while the incoming Emperor traversed the Empire attempting to win back those alienated by his brother's policies. The strain took a toll on Leopold and by the winter of 1791, he became ill.  He gradually worsened throughout early 1792; on the afternoon of 1 March Leopold died, at the relatively young age of 44. Francis, just past his 24th birthday, was now Emperor, much sooner than he had expected.

Emperor 

As the head of the Holy Roman Empire and the ruler of the vast multi-ethnic Habsburg hereditary lands, Francis felt threatened by the French revolutionaries and later Napoleon's expansionism as well as their social and political reforms which were being exported throughout Europe in the wake of the conquering French armies. Francis had a fraught relationship with France. His aunt Marie Antoinette, the wife of Louis XVI and Queen consort of France, was guillotined by the revolutionaries in 1793, at the beginning of his reign, although, on the whole, he was indifferent to her fate.

Later, he led the Holy Roman Empire into the French Revolutionary Wars. He briefly commanded the Allied forces during the Flanders Campaign of 1794 before handing over command to his brother Archduke Charles. He was later defeated by Napoleon. By the Treaty of Campo Formio, he ceded the left bank of the Rhine to France in exchange for Venice and Dalmatia. He again fought against France during the War of the Second Coalition.

On 11 August 1804, in response to Napoleon crowning himself as emperor of the French earlier that year, he announced that he would henceforth assume the title of hereditary emperor of Austria as Francis I, a move that technically was illegal in terms of imperial law. Yet Napoleon had agreed beforehand and therefore it happened.

During the War of the Third Coalition, the Austrian forces met a crushing defeat at Austerlitz, and Francis had to agree to the Treaty of Pressburg, which greatly weakened Austria and brought about the final collapse of the Holy Roman Empire. In July 1806, under massive pressure from France, Bavaria and fifteen other German states ratified the statutes founding the Confederation of the Rhine, with Napoleon designated Protector, and they announced to the Imperial Diet their intention to leave the Empire with immediate effect. Then, on 22 July, Napoleon issued an ultimatum to Francis demanding that he abdicate as Holy Roman Emperor by 10 August. Five days later, Francis bowed to the inevitable and, without mentioning the ultimatum, affirmed that since the Peace of Pressburg he had tried his best to fulfil his duties as emperor but that circumstances had convinced him that he could no longer rule according to his oath of office, the formation of the Confederation of the Rhine making that impossible. He added that "we hereby decree that we regard the bond which until now tied us to the states of the Empire as dissolved" in effect dissolving the empire. At the same time he declared the complete and formal withdrawal of his hereditary lands from imperial jurisdiction. After that date, he reigned as Francis I, Emperor of Austria.

In 1809, Francis attacked France again, hoping to take advantage of the Peninsular War embroiling Napoleon in Spain. He was again defeated, and this time forced to ally himself with Napoleon, ceding territory to the Empire, joining the Continental System, and wedding his daughter Marie-Louise to the Emperor. The Napoleonic wars drastically weakened Austria, making it entirely landlocked and threatened its preeminence among the states of Germany, a position that it would eventually cede to the Kingdom of Prussia.

In 1813, for the fifth and final time, Austria turned against France and joined Great Britain, Russia, Prussia and Sweden in their war against Napoleon. Austria played a major role in the final defeat of France—in recognition of this, Francis, represented by Clemens von Metternich, presided over the Congress of Vienna, helping to form the Concert of Europe and the Holy Alliance, ushering in an era of conservatism in Europe. The German Confederation, a loose association of Central European states was created by the Congress of Vienna in 1815 to organize the surviving states of the Holy Roman Empire. The Congress was a personal triumph for Francis, who hosted the assorted dignitaries in comfort, though Francis undermined his allies Tsar Alexander and Frederick William III of Prussia by negotiating a secret treaty with the restored French king Louis XVIII.

Domestic policy 

The violent events of the French Revolution impressed themselves deeply into the mind of Francis (as well as all other European monarchs), and he came to distrust radicalism in any form.  In 1794, a "Jacobin" conspiracy was discovered in the Austrian and Hungarian armies. The leaders were put on trial, but the verdicts only skirted the perimeter of the conspiracy.  Francis' brother Alexander Leopold (at that time Palatine of Hungary) wrote to the Emperor admitting "Although we have caught a lot of the culprits, we have not really got to the bottom of this business yet." Nonetheless, two officers heavily implicated in the conspiracy were hanged and gibbeted, while numerous others were sentenced to imprisonment (many of whom died from the conditions).

Francis was from his experiences suspicious and set up an extensive network of police spies and censors to monitor dissent (in this he was following his father's lead, as the Grand Duchy of Tuscany had the most effective secret police in Europe). Even his family did not escape attention. His brothers, the Archdukes Charles and Johann had their meetings and activities spied upon. Censorship was also prevalent. The author Franz Grillparzer, a Habsburg patriot, had one play suppressed solely as a "precautionary" measure.  When Grillparzer met the censor responsible, he asked him what was objectionable about the work.  The censor replied, "Oh, nothing at all.  But I thought to myself, 'One can never tell'."

In military affairs Francis had allowed his brother, the Archduke Charles, extensive control over the army during the Napoleonic wars.  Yet, distrustful of allowing any individual too much power, he otherwise maintained the separation of command functions between the Hofkriegsrat and his field commanders. In the later years of his reign he limited military spending, requiring it not exceed forty million florins per year; because of inflation this resulted in inadequate funding, with the army's share of the budget shrinking from half in 1817 to only twenty-three percent in 1830.

Francis presented himself as an open and approachable monarch (he regularly set aside two mornings each week to meet with his imperial subjects, regardless of status, by appointment in his office, even speaking to them in their own language), but his will was sovereign.  In 1804, he had no compunction about announcing that through his authority as Holy Roman Emperor, he declared he was now Emperor of Austria (at the time a geographical term that had little resonance).  Two years later, Francis personally wound up the moribund Holy Roman Empire of the German Nation.  Both actions were of dubious constitutional legality.

To increase patriotic sentiment during the war with France, the anthem "Gott erhalte Franz den Kaiser" was composed in 1797 to be sung as the Kaiserhymne to music by Joseph Haydn. The lyrics were adapted for later Emperors and the music lives on as the Deutschlandlied.

Later years 

On 2 March 1835, 43 years and a day after his father's death, Francis died in Vienna of a sudden fever aged 67, in the presence of many of his family and with all the religious comforts. His funeral was magnificent, with his Viennese subjects respectfully filing past his coffin in the chapel of Hofburg Palace for three days. Francis was interred in the traditional resting place of Habsburg monarchs, the Kapuziner Imperial Crypt in Vienna's Neue Markt Square. He is buried in tomb number 57, surrounded by his four wives.

Francis passed on a main point in the political testament he left for his son and heir Ferdinand: to "preserve unity in the family and regard it as one of the highest goods." In many portraits (particularly those painted by Peter Fendi) he was portrayed as the patriarch of a loving family, surrounded by his children and grandchildren.

Marriages 

Francis II married four times:

 On 6 January 1788, to Elisabeth of Württemberg (21 April 1767 – 18 February 1790).
 On 15 September 1790, to his double first cousin Maria Teresa of the Two Sicilies (6 June 1772 – 13 April 1807), daughter of King Ferdinand I of the Two Sicilies (both were grandchildren of Empress Maria Theresa and shared all of their other grandparents in common), with whom he had twelve children, of whom only seven reached adulthood.
 On 6 January 1808, he married again to another first cousin, Maria Ludovika of Austria-Este (14 December 1787 – 7 April 1816) with no issue. She was the daughter of Archduke Ferdinand of Austria-Este and Maria Beatrice d'Este, Princess of Modena.
 On 29 October 1816, to Karoline Charlotte Auguste of Bavaria (8 February 1792 – 9 February 1873) with no issue. She was daughter of Maximilian I Joseph of Bavaria and had been previously married to William I of Württemberg.

Children 
From his first wife Elisabeth of Württemberg, one daughter, and his second wife Maria Teresa of the Two Sicilies, eight daughters and four sons:

Titles, honours and heraldry

Titles 
From 1806 he used the titles: "We, Francis the First, by the Grace of God Emperor of Austria; King of Jerusalem, Hungary, Bohemia, Dalmatia, Croatia, Slavonia, Galicia and Lodomeria; Archduke of Austria; Duke of Lorraine, Salzburg, Würzburg, Franconia, Styria, Carinthia and Carniola; Grand Duke of Cracow; Grand Prince of Transylvania; Margrave of Moravia; Duke of Sandomir, Masovia, Lublin, Upper and Lower Silesia, Auschwitz and Zator, Teschen and Friule; Prince of Berchtesgaden and Mergentheim; Princely Count of Habsburg, Gorizia and Gradisca and of the Tirol; and Margrave of Upper and Lower Lusatia and in Istria".

Orders and decorations

Heraldry

Ancestors

See also 
 Family tree of the German monarchs

Explanatory notes

References

Citations

General sources

External links 

 Spencer Napoleonica Collection  at Newberry Library

1768 births
1835 deaths
Nobility from Florence
Austrian Roman Catholics
German Roman Catholics
18th-century Holy Roman Emperors
18th-century archdukes of Austria
19th-century Emperors of Austria
House of Habsburg-Lorraine
Kings of Italy
Burials at the Imperial Crypt
Grand Masters of the Order of the Golden Fleece
Knights of the Golden Fleece of Austria
Grand Crosses of the Military Order of Maria Theresa
Grand Croix of the Légion d'honneur
3
3
3
Knights Grand Cross of the Order of the Sword
Extra Knights Companion of the Garter
Dukes of Carniola
Sons of emperors
 
Children of Leopold II, Holy Roman Emperor
19th-century Archdukes of Austria